Kainya (born 19 September 1978), known as Lord Kenya, is a former Ghanaian Hiplife artist who is currently an Evangelist. He is best known for his hits such as "Enyom No" and "Medo."

About
Lord Kenya was born to an Nzema father from Senzire and an Asante mother from Fumesua in Kumasi both in Ghana. He earned the name Lord Kenya.

Education
He began his primary education at Central International School and had his Secondary education at Anglican Senior High School, Kumasi in the Ashanti Region and Nkwatia Secondary School in the Eastern Region of Ghana. He then did his sixth form at the Mpraeso Secondary School in the Eastern Region of Ghana. At the Kumasi Anglican Senior High School, he was the 400m and 110m hurdles top athlete.

Career
Lord Kenya desired to become a professional musician began at age 17, although he was familiarized with music right after birth. His parents desire was for him to practice law but a performance at his father's birthday party made them appreciate his talent. He joined Slip Music in 1998 and released his debut album Sika Card which instantly became one of the nations hits. He has seven albums to his credit; these are: Sika Card, Sika Baa, Yeesom Sika (which topped charts in Ghana), Sika Mpo Fane Ho, Akasieni, Born Again and God Dey.

Awards
Lord Kenya was nominated as the Artist of the Year while the title track of his second album Sika Baa also nominated as Rap Music of the Year at the first Ghana Music Awards. Winner of the Hiplife Album of the Year at the Ghana Music Award 2001, Best Ghanaian Rap Music Award at the Anansekrom Festival in Canada 2000, as well as a string of nominations elsewhere.

Conversion and Ministry 
He had an encounter with the Holy Spirit on 28 October 2010 and has not looked back ever since. He is the leader of the Face of Grace Covenant Temple at Ahodwo in Kumasi. He launched his Gospel album 'Christlife' in 2011. He has given up the rights to his hiplife albums and has no interest in their royalties. The switch was not easy in the beginning, especially with his financial status but he was happy with his new life because it would save his soul.

References

Living people
1978 births